Camps Bay High School is a public English medium co-educational high school situated in the suburb of Camps Bay of Cape Town in the Western Cape province of South Africa.

Sport  
Camps Bay High School has sports during the year.

The sports that are offered in the school are:

 Athletics
 Basketball
 Cricket
 Cross country
 Hockey
 Rugby
 Soccer
 Squash
 Swimming
 Tennis
 Water polo

Notable alumni 
 Lewis Pugh, swimmer and environmentalist 
 Stelio Savante, actor, producer and writer
 Simon Thirsk, swimmer

External links
 

Schools in Cape Town